Van Xuan University of Technology (abbreviated as VXUT) is a Vietnamese private university established in 2008, under the Decision No 1068/QD-TTg by the Prime Minister of Vietnam. Its main campus is in Cua Lo District, Nghe An, Vietnam. The second campus locates at Km 2, Lenin Avenue, Vinh city, Nghe An, Vietnam.

Fields of education
Graduate
 Master of Business Administration
Undergraduate
 Bio-Technology
 Business Administration
 Hotel Management
 Accounting & Auditing
 English
 Information Technology
 Construction
 Banking & Finance

Faculties
 General Education
 Bio-Technology Faculty
 Banking, Finance Faculty
 Business Management Faculty
 Accounting Faculty
 Information Technology Faculty
 Construction Faculty
 Foreign Language and International Study Faculty

See also
 List of universities in Vietnam
 Education in Vietnam
 Ministry of Education and Training, Vietnam

External links
 Van Xuan University of Technology Official Website (English)
 Van Xuan University of Technology Official Website (Vietnamese)
 Ministry of Education and Training of Vietnam

References 

Technical universities and colleges in Vietnam